is a  high Japanese mountain located around  north of Kobe in Hyōgo Prefecture. It should not be confused with Mount Mitake, a mountain in Tokyo, or Mount Ontake in Nagano Prefecture written with the same characters. This mountain is one of the 50 famous mountains in Hyōgo Prefecture.

History
Mount Mitake is the highest mountain in the Taki Mountains, including Mount Nishigatake and Mount Koganegadake. The Taki Mountains were one of the most holiest places for shugendō from Kamakura period to Muromachi period. However, Tanba Shugendō, a sect of Shugendo in Tanba Province, lost against Yamato Shugendō, another Shugendo sect of Yamato Province including Mount Ōmine, all of the temples in the Taki Mountains were burned in 1482.

Gallery

References
 Natural Parks of Hyōgo Prefecture
 Official Home Page of the Geographical Survey Institute in Japan

Mitake (Hyogo)
Shugendō